Bökingharde Frisian, also known as Mooring, is a dialect of the North Frisian language spoken in Niebüll and the amt of Bökingharde in the German region of North Frisia. The dialect forms part of the mainland group of North Frisian dialects.

The Mooring subdialects are spoken in the Risum Bog ( or ). Mooring is often used as a North Frisian lingua franca, especially on the internet, and there is a Mooring Frisian primary school in Risum-Lindholm.

Orthography

Vowels

Consonants

References

External links
Friisk Foriining

North Frisian language